Kemal Kaynas Stadyum is a multi-purpose stadium in Karaman, Turkey. It is currently used mostly for football matches and is the home ground of Karaman FK. The stadium currently holds 2,256.

References

Football venues in Turkey
Multi-purpose stadiums in Turkey